Gamasellus robustipes is a species of mite in the family Ologamasidae.

References

robustipes
Articles created by Qbugbot
Animals described in 1908